Phragmotheca rubriflora is a species of flowering plant in the family Malvaceae. It is found only in Colombia.

References

Bombacoideae
Endemic flora of Colombia
Vulnerable flora of South America
Taxonomy articles created by Polbot